The Tupolev Tu-143 Reys (Flight or Trip) was a Soviet unmanned reconnaissance aircraft  in service with the Soviet Army and a number of its Warsaw Pact and Middle East allies during the late 1970s and 1980s. It contained a reconnaissance pod that was retrieved after flight, and from which imagery was retrieved.

History

Development

The Tu-143 was introduced in 1976 and strongly resembled the Tu-141, but was substantially scaled-down. It was a short-range (60–70 kilometer) tactical reconnaissance system and had low-level flight capability. The Tu-143 was truck-launched with JATO boosting, recovered by parachute, and powered by a TR3-117 turbojet with 5.8 kN (590 kgf, 1300 lbf) thrust. The initial version carried film cameras, but later versions carried a TV or radiation detection payload, with data relayed to a ground station over a datalink. Some 950 units were produced in the 1970s and 1980s.

Operation history 
The Tu-143 was used by Syria in reconnaissance missions over Israel and Lebanon during the 1982 Lebanon War, as well as by Soviet forces in Afghanistan during the Soviet–Afghan War.

During the 2022 Russian invasion of Ukraine, Ukraine appeared to use them to spot Russian air defences and as an ersatz cruise missile.  On 29 June 2022, one Tu-143 carrying explosives was shot down in Kursk Oblast.

M-143 variant
A target drone version, the M-143, was introduced in the mid-1980s.

Tu-243 variant
The Tu-143 was followed into service in the late 1990s by the similar but improved "Tu-243 Reys-D", with a 25 cm (10 inch) fuselage stretch, to provide greater fuel capacity and about twice the range; it had an uprated TR3-117 engine with 6.28 kN (640 kgf, 1,410 lbf) thrust; and improved low-altitude guidance.

Tu-300 variant
Since 1995, Tupolev began promoting the further refined "Tu-300 Korshun", which resembles its predecessors but is fitted with a nose antenna dome and nose fairings for modern sensors and electronic systems. It also features a centerline pylon for a sensor pod or munitions. Financial issues forced a halt to development at the end of the 1990s, but work was resumed in 2007.

Operators

Current operators
  Korean People's Air Force
 
(in service as of 2016 as targets).

Former operators
  retired
  VR-3 Rejs, retired in 1995
  VR-3 was in service from 1985, passed to Czech Republic and Slovakia
 
  VR-3 in service from 1987 until the early 2000s
  VR-3 Rejs, retired
  Passed to Russia and Ukraine on dissolution of the USSR

Specifications

Tupolev TU-143 Reys:
wingspan 2.24 m (7 ft 4 in)
length                  8.06 m (26 ft 5 in)
height                  1.54 m (5 ft 1 in)
launch weight           1,230 kg (2,710 lb)
maximum speed           950 km/h            (515 kn, 590 mph)
engine                  Klimov turbojet TR3-117
service ceiling         5,000 m (16,400 ft)
range                   200 km              (110 nmi, 125 mi)

References
This article contains material that originally came from the web article Unmanned Aerial Vehicles by Greg Goebel, which exists in the Public Domain.

External links

 Czech Tu-143/VR-3 Rejs in museum with transport vehicle and launcher

Tu-0143
Unmanned aerial vehicles of the Soviet Union
Unmanned military aircraft of Russia